Norrland County, or Norrlands län, was a county of the Swedish Empire from 1634 to 1645.

In 1638 the northern part of the county, Västerbotten and Lappland, were separated and established as the Västerbotten County. On 5 September 1645 the remainder of the county was divided in two parts where the central part became the Härnösand County and the southern part became the Hudiksvall County. However, in 1654 Härnösand and Hudiksvall counties were reunited as the Västernorrland County.

The capital of Norrlands län was Hudiksvall.

Governors
Stellan Mörner (1634–1637)
Christer Posse (1637–1641)
Ivar Nilsson Natt och Dag (1641–1645)

See also
List of Västernorrland Governors
County Governors of Sweden
Norrland

Former counties of Sweden
1634 establishments in Sweden